HDX may refer to:
 HDX (Home Depot), in-house brand used by The Home Depot
 Fire HDX, Amazon Fire tablet computer
 Half-duplex, communication flowing in both directions, but not simultaneously
 Humanitarian Data Exchange, an open humanitarian data sharing platform managed by the United Nations Office for the Coordination of Humanitarian Affairs
 Hydrogen–deuterium exchange
 Lisofylline, an experimental anti-inflammatory drug
 Pro Tools HDX audio accelerator hardware
 Thomas Saf-T-Liner HDX, an American school bus
 Sky Sports HDX, a defunct Sky Sports HD channel brand